Larpool Viaduct, also known as the Esk Valley Viaduct is a 13 arch brick viaduct built to carry the Scarborough & Whitby Railway over the River Esk, North Yorkshire, England.

History and description

The viaduct was constructed for the Scarborough and Whitby Railway to carry a single track line over the River Esk and valley near Whitby, as well as crossing the Esk Valley Railway, and Whitby, Redcar and Middlesbrough Union Railway. Due to its situation close to the sea the design avoided the use of iron, using brick and cement construction; the design was based on the Saltburn Viaduct. Construction began in October 1882 and was complete by October 1884; two men fell from the piers during construction, but recovered. The resident engineer was Charles Arthur Rowlandson, the contractors were John Waddell and Sons.

The foundations on land were excavated to the level of rock, and formed from slag based cement. The river foundations were excavated in brick lined wells. The river foundation excavations were complicated by large oak trees found embedded in the river, which required divers for manual removal. Piers 5,7,8 and 9 had triple foundations, connected above the water level by two semicircular arches. Three of the piers in the river are skewed so as not to deflect the tidal flow (the River Esk is tidal as far as Ruswarp upstream).

Services on the line ended in March 1965 as a result of the Beeching Report.

The viaduct became grade II listed in 1972. In 2000 much of the former line and the viaduct were opened to the public. By 2006 parts of the brickwork had become unsafe due to spalling, and the parts of the outer layer were replaced. As of 2012 the viaduct is part of the 'Scarborough to Whitby Rail Trail', also promoted as the "Scarborough to Whitby Cinder Track", a cycle route.

The viaduct is mentioned in Bram Stoker's 1897 novel Dracula:

The viaduct is featured in the December 2007 episode of Heartbeat entitled "Another Sleepy, Dusty, Delta Day".

References

Sources

External links

Railway viaducts in North Yorkshire
Deck arch bridges
Grade II listed buildings in North Yorkshire
Former railway bridges in the United Kingdom